Fabian Ivanovich Abrantovich (Fabijan Abrantovič; , , ; September 14, 1884 – January 2, 1946) was a prominent religious and civic leader from Belarus. Abrantovich was significant in the struggle for the recognition of the Belarusian language in the Roman Catholic Church, the indoctrination of Belarusians of the Roman Catholic faith in their national character, and to the revival of concepts dealing with Belarusian statehood.

Biography
Abrantovich was born in Vieraskava, in the Novogrudsky Uyezd of Minsk Governorate (present-day Navahrudak District, Belarus). He first studied there and then in Saint-Petersburg at the Roman Catholic seminary and the Imperial Theological academy. He graduated with the degree of Master of Theology and was ordained to the priesthood on November 9, 1908. As one of the best students at the academy, Abrantovich received scholarship for study at the Catholic University of Leuven, Belgium, where he received Ph.D. in 1912.

Before World War I, Abrantovich was a faculty member at the Catholic Seminary in St.Petersburg. There he became very active in the Belarusian movement. He organized several groups of students and initiated numerous Belarusian publications. Abrantovich was the founder of the Belarusian Christian Movement and was the head of the first Belarusian Christian Union (Chryścijanskaja Demakratyčnaja Złučnaść) which was established in Petrograd (ex St. Petersburg) in May 1917. He was one of the Belarusian Roman Catholic priests who initiated the organization of the Belarusian political conference in Minsk in March 1917 and the conference of the Belarusian Roman Catholic Clergy, May 24–25, 1917. When the Roman Catholic Seminary opened in Minsk during the fall of 1918, Abrantovich was appointed rector of this institution. His time was divided between pastoral obligations, teaching, and Belarusian activities in Minsk. Father Abrantovich was convinced that Roman Catholicism in Belarus should have its own Belarusian character rather than serve as a cultural tool of the Poles to promote polonization.
 
After the partition of Belarus in 1921 between Poland and Soviet Russia, Abrantovich moved to the Poland-controlled West Belarus: first to the city of Pinsk, and in 1926 to the town of Druja where the Congregation of Marian Fathers had opened a Gymnasium and where Marianist priests settled in 1923. However, his political activities did not stop there: he vigorously protested the Concordat between the Holy See and the Polish government and supported numerous Belarusian political programs. At the request of the Polish church authorities, Abrantovich was removed from Druja and sent away to Harbin in Manchuria, where he was Eastern Catholic Apostolic Exarch.

In 1939 he was in Rome to elect a new Superior, and decided afterwards to visit his colleagues in Poland (Belarus and Galicia), but in September the Soviet troops invaded the East part of Poland, and the German troops the West part. Father Abrantovich was arrested by the NKVD in October after an attempt to pass the frontier toward German-occupied Poland. He was imprisoned in Lwow, and tortured. Later on he was transferred to the Butyrka prison in Moscow. The place and the date of his death are not established with 100% certainty, although it is thought that he died from torture in the Butyrka prison on January 2, 1946.

References

See also
 West Belarus
 Vladimir Kolupaev. Belarusian missionaries in China // Entries 37. New York - Miensk: Belarusian Institute of Science and Art, 2014. p. 645 - 650.

1884 births
1946 deaths
People from Navahrudak District
People from Novogrudsky Uyezd
Belarusian Roman Catholic priests
Belarusian Christian Democracy politicians
Members of the Rada of the Belarusian Democratic Republic
20th-century Roman Catholic priests
Catholic University of Leuven (1834–1968) alumni
Soviet people who died in prison custody
Prisoners who died in Soviet detention